Julia Chevanne-Gimel (born 7 November 1975) is a French equestrian. She competed at the 2004 Summer Olympics and the 2008 Summer Olympics.

She became the French national champion in 2003 and 2007.

References

1975 births
Living people
French female equestrians
French dressage riders
Olympic equestrians of France
Equestrians at the 2004 Summer Olympics
Equestrians at the 2008 Summer Olympics
Sportspeople from Paris